Turtle Reef is a coral reef situated at the northern extremity of the Turtle Rocks shoal, and located within the Florida Keys National Marine Sanctuary. It lies to the east of Key Largo, within the Key Largo Existing Management Area, which is immediately to the east of John Pennekamp Coral Reef State Park. Unlike many reefs within the National Marine Sanctuary, this reef is not within a Sanctuary Preservation Area (SPA).  The reef is north of Carysfort Reef.

References
 NOAA National Marine Sanctuary Maps, Florida Keys East
 NOAA Map of buoys around Turtle Rocks
 NOAA Navigational Chart 11463

Coral reefs of the Florida Keys